Śliwka is a Polish surname meaning "plum". Notable people include:

 Aleksander Śliwka (born 1995), Polish volleyball player
 Karol Śliwka (1894-1943), Polish communist politician
 Maria Śliwka (1935-1997), Polish volleyball player

See also
 

Polish-language surnames